Adam 'n' Eve is the second album from Gavin Friday and again features Friday teaming up with musician Maurice "The Man" Seezer.

Track listing
All tracks composed by Gavin Friday and Maurice Seezer
 "I Want to Live" – 4:03
 "Falling Off the Edge of the World" – 4:19
 "King of Trash" – 2:45
 "Why Say Goodbye" – 2:47
 "Saint Divine" – 4:41
 "Melancholy Baby" – 5:16
 "Fun and Experience" – 4:05
 "The Big No! No!" – 3:07
 "Where in the World?" – 3:55
 "Wind and Rain" – 5:27
 "Eden" – 4:37

Personnel
Gavin Friday - vocals
Maurice Seezer
Chris Cunningham, David Tronzo; Ally McErlaine, Des O'Byrne - guitar
Erik Sanko - bass
Jimmy Bralower, Mikey Wilson, Ian Bryan, Paul Barrett - drums
Michael Blair - percussion
Sarah Homer - bass clarinet
Maria McKee, Miriam Blennerhassett, Howard Kaylan, Mark Volman - background vocals
Colm McCaughey - violin
The NBC Orchestra on "Melancholy Baby"
Ian Bryan, Jefferey Lippay, Stephen Shelton, Willie Mannion - engineers

Other

Adam 'N' Eve (CD) Island Records 1992
Adam 'N' Eve (Cass, Album) Island Records Germany 1992
Adam 'N' Eve (LP) Island Records, Island Records Germany 1992
Adam 'N' Eve (LP, Album) Island Records Germany1992
Adam 'n' Eve (CD, Album) Island Records, Island Records, Europe 1992
Adam 'n' Eve (CD, Album) Island Records, Germany 1992
Adam 'n' Eve (CD, Album) Island Records UK 1992
Adam 'n' Eve (CD, Album) Island Masters 1993

External links
 Versions

References

Gavin Friday albums
1992 albums
Albums produced by Hal Willner
Albums produced by Flood (producer)